Wilbur Richard Louis Trimpe (June 10, 1906 – April 15, 1996) was an American educator from Illinois. Over the course of his career, he served as a teacher, principal, superintendent, regional superintendent, and college president in Southern Illinois. Trimpe was the first superintendent for Bethalto Community Unit School District 8 and third president of Lewis and Clark Community College. During his time as Regional Superintendent of Schools for Madison County, Trimpe advocated for the establishment and development of a system of statewide community colleges for Illinois.

Early life 
Trimpe was born June 10, 1906 to Carl and Katherine (Leithoff) Trimpe. He was raised in Mason County, Illinois. He earned a bachelor’s degree from Western Illinois college in 1942, a master’s degree from the University of Illinois in 1945, and worked towards a doctorate degree at both the University of Colorado and Southern Illinois University.

Career 
On May 20, 1950, it was announced that Trimpe was hired as superintendent of Bethalto Elementary District 152 and the newly formed Civic Memorial High School District 100. However, a referendum on June 2, 1950 combined the two districts, establishing Bethalto Community Unit School District 8. When Trimpe left Bethalto CUSD8 in 1959, Wilbur Trimpe Junior High (now Trimpe Middle School) was named after him.

After the 1958-1959 school year, Trimpe left Bethalto Schools upon being elected Regional Superintendent of Schools for Madison County. He served as regional superintendent from 1959 to 1973. In 1973, Trimpe was selected to be the third president of Lewis and Clark Community College. He held this position until his retirement in 1983. In his previous position as regional superintendent, Trimpe lead the effort in 1969 to create the Lewis and Clark Community College district. The vocational technical building on campus was dedicated to Trimpe and named the "Trimpe Vocational-Technical Building”.

In 1982, Trimpe was inducted to the Illinois Basketball Hall of Fame for his 33 years of high school basketball officiating.

Philanthropy 
In 1995, Trimpe created the Wanita E. and Wilbur R.L. Trimpe Endowment Scholarship Fund. The scholarship is awarded to Civic Memorial High School graduates entering Lewis and Clark Community College.

Death 
Wilbur Trimpe died in Morrison, Illinois on April 15, 1996. He was 89 years old.

References 

1906 births
1996 deaths
Western Illinois University alumni
University of Illinois Urbana-Champaign alumni
Illinois Democrats